The Motorsport UK Scottish Rally Championship is a rallying series run throughout Scotland over the course of a year that comprises both gravel and tarmac surface rallies. The 2022 series began on the forest tracks around Inverness on 5 March with the season finale due to take place in Kielder Forest, Northumberland on 22 October. The championship will be sponsored by KNC Groundworks for the fourth year in succession.

Following the Galloway Hills Rally in September, driver David Bogie was declared champion after winning five of the seven events thus far.

2022 calendar
For season 2022 there will be eight events held on both gravel and tarmac surfaces.

2022 events podium

Drivers Points Classification

Points are awarded to the highest placed registered driver on each event as follows: 30, 28, 27, 26, and so on down to 1 point. 
At the end of the Championship, competitors will count their best 6 scores out of the 8 events as his/her final overall Championship score.

Co-Drivers Points Classification

{|
|

References

External links
 
 RSAC Scottish Rally Homepage

Scottish Rally Championship seasons
Rally Championship
Scottish Rally Championship
Scottish Rally Championship